Vladimir Vladimirovich Leonov (born 26 April 1987) is a Russian professional motorcycle racer. He has competed in the 250cc World Championship, the Moto2 World Championship and the Supersport World Championship. Leonov was the first Russian to achieve a podium finish in the latter category, a third place in rainy conditions in the 2012 Assen round.

Career statistics

Grand Prix motorcycle racing

By season

Races by year
(key)

Supersport World Championship

Races by year

Superbike World Championship

Races by year

References

External links

1987 births
Living people
People from Donetsk, Russia
Russian motorcycle racers
250cc World Championship riders
Moto2 World Championship riders
Supersport World Championship riders
Superbike World Championship riders
Sportspeople from Rostov Oblast